Ambrogio Buonvicino (c. 1552 - 1622) was an Italian sculptor of the late-Renaissance or Mannerist period, active mainly in Rome.

He was born in Milan, and trained under Pietro Antichi. He moved to Rome around 1581. Among his works are bas-reliefs above the main door to St Peter's Basilica (Donation of the Keys to St Peter); the monument to Pope Urban VII at Santa Maria Sopra Minerva; and for the Monuments to Popes Clement VIII and Paul V in the Paoline Chapel in Santa Maria Maggiore.

References

Artists from Milan
16th-century Italian sculptors
Italian male sculptors
17th-century Italian sculptors
Renaissance sculptors
1550s births
1622 deaths